Philip Gerard Reeves (born 19 September 1966) is an Australian politician.

Early life and career
Born in Brisbane, he received a Bachelor of Arts in Leisure Management from Griffith University and was a sports management and marketing consultant. He joined the Labor Party in 1987 and was Vice-President of the Garden City Branch.

Member of parliament
In 1998, he was elected to the Legislative Assembly of Queensland as the member for Mansfield, defeating sitting Liberal MP Frank Carroll. Reeves represented Mansfield until the 2012 election, and was Minister for Child Safety and Minister for Sport from 26 March 2009.

Personal life
Phil Reeves is married to Megan and has three children, Brianna, Ashleigh and Jemma.

References

1966 births
Living people
Members of the Queensland Legislative Assembly
Griffith University alumni
People from Brisbane
Australian Labor Party members of the Parliament of Queensland
21st-century Australian politicians
20th-century Australian people